The word toadshade is used in the common names of several species of flowering plants in the genus Trillium, including:

 Trillium albidum, the white toadshade
 Trillium cuneatum, the large toadshade, also known as the purple toadshade
 Trillium discolor, the small yellow toadshade
 Trillium recurvatum, a toadshade
 Trillium sessile, another toadshade